KLJX-LP ("KJACK", 107.1 FM) is a student-run college radio station serving the Northern Arizona University campus in Flagstaff, Arizona, United States. The station broadcasts a variety of music in a freeform format, as well as campus and high school sports coverage. The station operates out of the NAU School of Communication on the school's Flagstaff campus.

About KJACK
KJACK is run by the students of Northern Arizona University, with students hosting shows in one-hour blocks featuring music, sports, pop culture, politics and news. In 2013, the station applied to the FCC for an FM broadcasting license. KJACK was granted an FM construction permit to broadcast on 107.1 FM with the call letters KLJX-LP, and was issued its license to cover on November 23, 2015. As of 2020, the station manager is Jimmy Moreau. The station hosts an annual arts festival in downtown Flagstaff and broadcasts NAU's D2 and D3 hockey games.

References

External links
 Website
 

Northern Arizona University
LJX-LP
LJX-LP
LJX-LP
Radio stations established in 2015
2015 establishments in Arizona